All India Central Council of Trade Unions (AICCTU) is a central trade union federation in India. It is politically attached to Communist Party of India (Marxist–Leninist) Liberation. According to provisional statistics from the Ministry of Labour, AICCTU had a membership of 639,962 in 2002.

AICCTU is affiliated to the World Federation of Trade Unions.

Federations affiliated to AICCTU
AICWF (All India Construction Workers Federation)
All India Contract Workers Federation
Indian Railways Employees Federation

See also
Indian Trade Unions

External links

References

Trade unions in India
 
World Federation of Trade Unions